iClassical Academy is a limited company organized according to Swiss law, it is domiciled in Crans-Montana.

The company is committed to producing educational online video for musicians, in particular master classes and courses.

It provides master classes and courses for piano, violin, cello, conducting, music & career, guitar and trumpet. It also offers music teachers the possibility to create and publish their own courses under the label musiMentors.

Since October 2020, iClassical Academy has introduced 360° view learning, a set of courses and master classes, including music, career and other business-related skills to complete musicians' curriculum.

Professors 
Many musicians joined iClassical Academy, including: Peter Frankl, Ricardo Castro, Virginie Robilliard, Rudolf Koelman, Gülsin Onay, Hagai Shaham, Dmitry Yablonsky, Amit Peled, Klaidi Sahatci, Sergey Ostrovsky, Vera Tsu, Evangeline Benedetti, Uri Vardi, Gyorgy Pauk, Denis Zhdanov, Jana Gandelman, Maria Tchaikovskaya, Maurizio Baglini, Zvi Plesser, Peter Szabo, Sander Sittig, Oxana Yablonskaya, Silvia Chiesa e Marco Pierobon.

Partners 
 Medici TV
 Naxos Video Library
Sibelius Academy

References

External links 
 Official website

Swiss educational websites
Online edutainment
Valais
Articles containing video clips
Organisations based in Switzerland